The Thornberry Creek LPGA Classic was a women's professional golf tournament in Wisconsin on the LPGA Tour. It debuted in 2017 and was played at Thornberry Creek at Oneida, just northwest of Green Bay. Opened in 1994, the course is owned by the Oneida Nation.

On August 21, 2019, the Oneida Nation announced that due to the lack of return on the investment to run the event they were not going to renew their contract with the LPGA to continue the tournament.

The 2018 event saw Kim Sei-young post the lowest to-par score (−31) and the lowest 72-hole total score (257) in LPGA Tour history.

Winners

Tournament records

References

External links
Official website (Archived)
Coverage on the LPGA Tour's official site
Thornberry Creek at Oneida

Former LPGA Tour events
Golf in Wisconsin
Sports in Green Bay, Wisconsin
Recurring sporting events established in 2017
Recurring sporting events disestablished in 2019
2017 establishments in Wisconsin
2019 disestablishments in Wisconsin